The 53rd annual Berlin International Film Festival was held from February 6–16, 2003. The festival opened with musical film Chicago by Rob Marshall and closed with Martin Scorsese's Gangs of New York, both films played out of competition at the festival. The Golden Bear was awarded to British film In This World directed by Michael Winterbottom.

The retrospective dedicated to German film director F. W. Murnau was shown at the festival.

Jury 

The following people were announced as being on the jury for the festival:

International Jury
 Atom Egoyan, director, screenwriter and producer (Canada) - Jury President
 Martina Gedeck, actress (Germany)
 Anna Galiena, actress (Italy)
 Kathryn Bigelow, director, screenwriter and producer (United States)
 Abderrahmane Sissako, director (Mauritania)
 Humbert Balsan, actor and producer (France)
 Geoffrey Gilmore, director of the Tribeca Film Festival (United States)

International Short Film Jury
 Andreas Dresen, director and screenwriter (Germany)
 Phyllis Mollet, director of communication of the FIAPF (France)
 Thom Palmen, director of the Umeå International Film Festival (Sweden)

Official selection

In-competition
The following films were in competition for the Golden Bear and Silver Bear awards:

Short films

Key
{| class="wikitable" width="550" colspan="1"
| style="background:#FFDEAD;" align="center"| †
|Winner of the main award for best film in its section
|-
| colspan="2"| The opening and closing films are screened during the opening and closing ceremonies respectively.
|}

Retrospective

The following films were shown in the retrospective:

Awards

The following prizes were awarded by the Jury:
Golden Bear
In This World: Michael Winterbottom
Silver Bear
Best Film Music – Madame Brouette: Majoly, Serge Fiori, Maadu Diabaté
Best Actor – Confessions of a Dangerous Mind: Sam Rockwell
Best Actress – The Hours: Meryl Streep, Nicole Kidman, Julianne Moore
Best Director – Son frère: Patrice Chéreau
Best Short Film – In Absentia: Lucía Cedrón and The Tram #9 Was Going: Stepan Koval
Outstanding Artistic Contribution – Blind Shaft: Yang Li
Jury Grand Prix – Adaptation: Spike Jonze
Honorary Golden Bear
Anouk Aimée
Berlinale Camera
Artur Brauner
Peer Raben
Erika Richter
Panorama Audience Award
Broken Wings: Nir Bergman
Crystal Bear
Best Short Film – Pipsqueak Prince: Zoia Trofimova
Best Feature Film – Elina: As If I Wasn't There: Klaus Härö
FIPRESCI Award
Distant Lights by Hans-Christian Schmid
Special Mention
Remake by Dino Mustafić

References

External links
 53rd Berlin International Film Festival on IMDb
 Yearbook for the Berlinale 2003 berlinale.de
  Berlin International Film Festival 2003

Berlin International Film Festival
B
B
2003 in Berlin
2003 in German cinema